Curt Bois (born Kurt Boas; April 5, 1901 – December 25, 1991) was a German actor with a career spanning over 80 years. He is best remembered for his performances as the pickpocket in Casablanca (1942) and the poet Homer in Wings of Desire (1987).

Life and career 

Bois was born to a German Jewish family in Berlin and began acting in 1907, becoming one of the film world's first child actors, with a role in the silent movie Bauernhaus und Grafenschloß. In 1909, he played the title role in Der Kleine Detektiv ('The Little Detective'). Bois performed in theatre, cabaret, musicals, silent films, and "talkies" over his long acting career. He performed under Max Reinhardt and found success in 1928 in a Viennese stage production of "Charley's Aunt" at the Josefstadt Theater. He was a successful character comic, and for a while film studios tried to make him into a "German Harold Lloyd".

In 1934, institutionalized Anti-Semitism forced the Jewish Bois to leave his home in Nazi Germany for the United States. There he found work on stage on Broadway. By 1937, he had made his way to Hollywood and began acting in films, the best-known being Casablanca  (1942), in which he warns a befuddled English gentleman to be on guard against pickpockets ("vultures everywhere") while stealing the man's wallet. He had a notable supporting role in Caught (1949), starring Robert Ryan, Barbara Bel Geddes, and James Mason; Ryan played a megalomaniacal industrialist openly based on Howard Hughes and Bois was Ryan's conflicted fixer, Franzi Kartos. Most of his Hollywood roles were small, but nevertheless Bois was in demand. After World War II, Bois decided it was safe to return to Germany, which he did in 1950.

Bois finished his life and career in Germany, first in the East, and then in the West. He appeared at the Schiller Theater and the Theater des Westens for many years. One of his final performances was in Wim Wenders' Der Himmel über Berlin (Wings of Desire) in 1987, portraying the aged poet Homer "who endlessly wanders Berlin in the hope of properly capturing the city on paper". He won the European Film Award for Best Supporting Actor for this role. He played his last role in the 1989 short film Das letzte Band, ending a film career of 82 years. Bois died in Berlin, the city of his birth, at the age of 90.

Complete filmography 

 Bauernhaus und Grafenschloß (1907, Short)
 Der fidele Bauer – 1. Terzett: Ein Infant'rist, ein Artill'rist (1908, Short)
 Der fidele Bauer – 2. Terzett: Bauernmarsch (1908, Short)
 Der fidele Bauer – 3. Duettino zwischen Liesl und Heinerle (1908, Short)
 Der kleine Detektiv (1909, Short) 
 Mutterliebe (1909, Short)
 Klebolin klebt alles (1909, Short)
 Ein neuer Erwerbszweig (1912, Short)
 Des Pfarrers Töchterlein (The Minister's Daughter) (1913, Short)
 Das Geschenk des Inders (1914) as Child
 Streichhölzer, kauft Streichhölzer! (1916)
 BZ-Maxe & Co. (1916)
  (1916)
 Tante Röschen will heiraten (1916)
 Die Spinne (1917)
 Abenteuer im Warenhaus (1917, Short) 
  (1917)
 Das Unruhige Hotel (1917) 
 Der Dieb (1918) as Hellmuth
  (1918)
 Der Gast aus der vierten Dimension (1918)
 So'n kleiner Schwerenöter (1918, Short) 
 The Oyster Princess (1919) as Conductor
 She and the Three (1922) as Der Hilfsregisseur
 When She Starts, Look Out (1926) as Ali ben Mokka
 Der goldene Schmetterling (The Golden Butterfly) (1926) as André Dubois, Ballettmeister
 The Young Man from the Ragtrade (1926) as Moritz Spiegel
 Countess Ironing-Maid (1926)
 The Prince of Pappenheim (1927) as Egon Fürst
 The Transformation of Dr. Bessel (1927) as Simche Regierer
 Majestät schneidet Bubiköpfe (1928)
 Anschluß um Mitternacht (Call at Midnight) (1929) as Emil
 Der Schlemihl (1931) as Hartwig
 Ein steinreicher Mann (A Tremendously Rich Man) (1932) as Curt
 Hollywood Hotel (1937) as Dress Designer
 Tovarich (1937) as Alfonso
 Romance in the Dark (1938) as Von Hemisch
 Gold Diggers in Paris (1938) as Padrinsky
 The Amazing Dr. Clitterhouse (1938) as Rabbit
 Boy Meets Girl (1938) as Dance Director (uncredited)
 Garden of the Moon (1938) as Maharajah of Sund
 The Great Waltz (1938) as Kienzl
 Hotel Imperial (1939) as Anton
 The Hunchback of Notre Dame (1939) as Student
 The Lady in Question (1940) as Henri Lurette
 Boom Town (1940) as Ferdie
 He Stayed for Breakfast (1940) as Comrade Tronavich
 Hullabaloo (1940) as Armand Francois
 Bitter Sweet (1940) as Ernst
 That Night in Rio (1941) as Salles
 Hold Back the Dawn (1941) as Bonbois
 Blue, White and Perfect (1942) as Friedrich Gerber, alias Nappy Dubois
 The Tuttles of Tahiti (1942) as Jensen
 My Gal Sal (1942) as De Rochemont
 Pacific Rendezvous (1942) as Kestrin
 Casablanca (1942) as Pickpocket
 Destroyer (1943) as Yasha (uncredited)
 Paris After Dark (1943) as Max (uncredited)
 Princess O'Rourke (1943) as Count Peter de Candome
 Swing Fever (1943) as Nick Sirocco
 The Desert Song (1943) as François
 Cover Girl (1944) as Chef at Danny McGuire's
 Gypsy Wildcat (1944) as Valdi
 Blonde Fever (1944) as Brillon
 The Spanish Main (1945) as Paree
 Saratoga Trunk (1945) as Augustin Haussy
 Jungle Flight (1947) as Pepe
 The Woman from Tangier (1948) as Parquit
 Arch of Triumph (1948) as Tattooed Waiter
 French Leave (1948) as Marcel
 The Woman in White (1948) as Louis
 Up in Central Park (1948) as Maitre d' (uncredited)
 Let's Live a Little (1948) as Chemist (uncredited)
 Caught (1949) as Franzi Kartos
 Kiss in the Dark (1949) as Hugo Schloss
 The Lovable Cheat (1949) as Count de la Brive
 The Great Sinner (1949) as Jeweler / Money Lender
 Oh, You Beautiful Doll (1949) as Zaltz (uncredited)
 Joe Palooka Meets Humphrey (1950) as Pierre
 Fortunes of Captain Blood (1950) as King Charles II
 Androklus und der Löwe (Androcles and the Lion) (1958, TV film) as Androklus
 Herr Puntila and His Servant Matti (1955–1960) as Johannes Puntila
 The Haunted Castle (1960) as Hugo
 Flüchtlingsgespräche (1964, TV film) as Ziffel
 Der eingebildete Kranke (1964, TV film) as Argan
  (A Scoundrel's Honor) (1966) as Emil
 Die hundertste Nacht (1966, TV film) as Iwakichi
 Bert Brecht vor dem McCarthy-Ausschuß (1966, TV film)
 Der Zauberberg (1968, TV film) as Naphta
 Amerika oder der Verschollene (1968, TV film) as Karl Roßmann's father
 Der Pott (1971, TV film) as Simon Norton
 Der trojanische Sessel (1971, TV film) as Franz Seider
 Strychnin und saure Drops (1974 TV film)
 Das Rentenspiel (1977, TV film) as Grandfather
 Das Idol von Mordassow (1979, TV film)
 Liebe, Tod und Heringshäppchen (1979, TV film) as Friedrich Schlick
 Die Alten kommen (1980, TV film)
 Wochenendgeschichten (1980, TV film)
 Bühne frei für Kolowitz (1980, TV film) as Benjamin Weiß
 Der Mond scheint auf Kylenamoe (1980, TV film)
 Gesucht wird... Drei Geschichten um nicht ganz ehrenwerte Herren (1980, TV film)
 Das Boot ist voll (1981) as Lazar Ostrowskij
 Flächenbrand (1981, TV film) as Bühler
 Der Schützling (1981, TV film) as Leiser
 Die feine englische Art: Täglich eine gute Tat (1982, TV film) as Lord Emsworth
 Die feine englische Art: Hundeglück (1982, TV film) as Lord Emsworth
 Die feine englische Art: Die Lady frißt (1982, TV film) as Lord Emsworth
 Die feine englische Art: Blut wird fließen (1982, TV film) as Lord Emsworth
 The Roaring Fifties (1983) (uncredited)
 Wings of Desire (1987) as Homer

References

Bibliography 
John Holmstrom, The Moving Picture Boy: An International Encyclopaedia from 1895 to 1995, Norwich, Michael Russell, 1996, pp. 18–19.

External links 

 
 
 
 
 
 Curt Bois biography from Thomas Staedeli's index of German film stars and filmmakers from 1903–1945
 Photographs of Curt Bois

1901 births
1991 deaths
20th-century German male actors
Commanders Crosses of the Order of Merit of the Federal Republic of Germany
European Film Awards winners (people)
German expatriate male actors in the United States
German male film actors
German male silent film actors
Jewish German male actors
Jewish emigrants from Nazi Germany to the United States
Male actors from Berlin